Minnesota became a new state in 1858 having already elected its first two members at-large in October 1857 to finish the current term.  The state then held elections to the next term October 4, 1859.

See also 
 1858 and 1859 United States House of Representatives elections
 List of United States representatives from Minnesota
 1858 United States Senate elections in Minnesota

References 

1858
Minnesota
United States House of Representatives